Quietus is the second album by the American doom metal band Evoken. It was released in 2001.

Track listing

Personnel
 John Paradiso – Guitars/Vocals
 Nick Orlando – Guitars
 Steve Moran – Bass
 Vince Verkay – Drums
 Dario Derna – Keyboards
 Suzanne Bass – Session Cello

References

Evoken albums
2001 albums
Avantgarde Music albums